Women in Black (Nashim BeShahor) is a women's anti-war movement with an estimated 10,000 activists around the world. The first group was formed by Israeli women in Jerusalem in 1988, following the outbreak of the First Intifada.

History

Responding to what they considered serious violations of human rights by Israeli soldiers in the Occupied Territories, the women held a vigil every Friday in central Jerusalem, wearing black clothing in mourning for all victims of the conflict. Initially the group had no name but it was quickly identified with the black clothing, which also helped create distinctive demonstrations which were hard to ignore.

The initiative soon spread to various other locations in Israel, with women standing weekly in main squares of cities or at junctions on inter-city highways. As was decided early on, the movement did not adopt any formal program other than opposition to the occupation. Local groups were autonomous in deciding such issues as whether or not to open participation to men as well as women, and there were many shades of political difference from one place to another.

At the peak of the Intifada there were thirty vigils in different locations throughout the country. The number dwindled sharply after the Oslo Agreement in 1993, when it seemed that peace with the Palestinians was at hand, and picked up again when violent events proved that hope to have been premature.

The first vigils in other countries were started in solidarity with the Israeli group, but then embraced other social and political issues. Especially notable were the Women in Black group in former Yugoslavia, which in the 1990s confronted rampant nationalism, hatred and bloodshed, often meeting with violence from nationalists.

Women in Black in India stands against Hindu Fundamentalism and the violence it inflicted upon women. Women in Black in Italy protest against war and organized crimes. In Australia, WIB stands against domestic violence.

While each group is free to pursue its own goals and activities, the women maintain regular contact via e-mail and the Internet, and hold annual international conferences. Their most common tactic consists of standing together periodically in various public places, usually in complete silence unless pedestrians ask questions, which at times escalate into full-fledged arguments. The Women in Black's counter-group is called Women for Israel's Tomorrow who typically wear green hats.

The 2015 WIB gathering took place in India, Bangalore with the participation of several feminist organizations.

Political position 
In Israel, Women in Black belongs to the radical left. The organization supports the BDS movement.

Awards
In 2001, the movement was awarded the Millennium Peace Prize for Women given by the United Nations Development Fund for Women. The same year, the Israeli and Serbian groups were nominated for Nobel Peace Prize.

See also
Coalition of Women for a Just Peace
Code Pink
Women in Green

Bibliography

References

External links
Official website
UK branch website
Women in Black documents Israeli Left Archive
Twenty years' anniversary of the Women in Black Women's News

Anti-war movement
Feminist organizations in Israel
Peace organizations based in Israel
Jewish anti-occupation groups
Non-governmental organizations involved in the Israeli–Palestinian conflict